Reda Boultam (born 3 March 1998) is a Dutch professional footballer who plays as a midfielder for HNL club Istra 1961, on loan from Salernitana. Besides the Netherlands, he has played in Italy.

Club career
Boultam made his professional debut in the Eerste Divisie for Jong Ajax on 27 January 2017 in a game against FC Den Bosch.

On 9 July 2018, Boultam's contract at Ajax was not extended. He moved on a free transfer to Italian club Cremonese.

On 7 August 2020, he broke his contract for the Italian club.

On 16 August 2020, Triestina announced that Boultam had signed a three-year contract with the club.

On 1 February 2021, he moved to Serie B club Salernitana on loan with an obligation to buy.

On 12 August 2021, he went to Cosenza on loan. On 31 August 2022, Boultam was loaned to Istra 1961 in Croatia.

Career statistics

Club

References

External links
 

1998 births
People from Meknes
Footballers from Almere
Living people
Dutch footballers
Netherlands youth international footballers
Dutch sportspeople of Moroccan descent
Association football midfielders
Eerste Divisie players
Serie B players
Serie C players
AFC Ajax players
Jong Ajax players
U.S. Cremonese players
U.S. Triestina Calcio 1918 players
U.S. Salernitana 1919 players
Cosenza Calcio players
NK Istra 1961 players
Dutch expatriate footballers
Dutch expatriate sportspeople in Italy
Expatriate footballers in Italy
Dutch expatriate sportspeople in Croatia
Expatriate footballers in Croatia